The Czech Republic Men's Under-19 National Floorball Team is the men's under-19 national floorball team of the Czech Republic, and a member of the International Floorball Federation. The team is composed of the best Czech floorball players under the age of 19. The Czech under-19 men's team is currently ranked 1st in the world at floorball, after winning the last two championships in 2019 and 2021.

All-time world championships results

World championships results against other teams

References

External links
Czech Floorball Union 
Czech Republic on IFF website

Floorball in the Czech Republic
Men's national floorball teams
National sports teams of the Czech Republic